SQream is a relational database management system (RDBMS) that uses graphics processing units (GPUs) from  Nvidia.
SQream is designed for big data analytics using the Structured Query Language (SQL).

History
SQream is the first product from SQream Technologies Ltd, founded in 2010 by Ami Gal and  Kostya Varakin in Tel Aviv, Israel.

SQream was first released in 2014 after a partnership with an Orange S.A. in Silicon Valley.
The company claimed Orange S.A. saved $6 million by using SQream in 2014.
SQream is aimed at the budget multi-terabyte analytics market, due to its modest hardware requirements and use of compression.

SQream is also the basis for a product named GenomeStack, for querying many DNA sequences simultaneously.
A US$7.4M investment of venture capital was announced in June 2015. 
It is an example of general-purpose computing on graphics processing units, alongside Omnisci and Kinetica.

The company applied for patents, encompassing parallel execution queries on multi-core processors and speeding up parallel execution on vector processors.

In February 2018, SQream Technologies partnered with Alibaba group's Alibaba Cloud to deliver a GPU Database solution on Alibaba Cloud. 

In December 2021, SQream announced that it had acquired no-code data platform Panoply for an undisclosed sum, as part of the push to grow its cloud offering.

Software and features
The column-oriented database SQream platform was designed to manage large, fast-growing volumes of data, for compute-intensive queries. The product claims to improve query performance for very large datasets, over traditional relational database systems. 

SQream is designed to run on premise or in the public cloud.

References

External links

SQL
Relational database management systems
Relational database management software for Linux
Products introduced in 2014
Column-oriented DBMS software for Linux
Big data products
Israeli inventions
Haskell software